This is a list of the earliest films produced in the cinema of Georgia between 1909 and 1919, ordered by year of release:

External links
 Library of National filmography
 Georgian film at the Internet Movie Database
 http://www.babaduli.de

1900s
Films
Lists of 1900s films
Films
Lists of 1910s films

ka:ქართული ფილმების სია
ru:Список фильмов Грузии